Patrick F. Mulvany (born 1940) is an Irish former Gaelic footballer who played for club side Skryne and at inter-county level with the Meath senior football team. He usually lined out as a right corner-forward.

Honours

Skryne
Meath Senior Football Championship: 1965

Meath
All-Ireland Senior Football Championship: 1967
Leinster Senior Football Championship: 1964, 1966, 1967
All-Ireland Junior Football Championship: 1962
Leinster Junior Football Championship: 1962

References

1940 births
Living people
Kilmessan hurlers
Skryne Gaelic footballers
Meath inter-county Gaelic footballers
Winners of one All-Ireland medal (Gaelic football)